Neola  is an unincorporated community in northeastern Greenbrier County, West Virginia, United States.  It lies along West Virginia Route 92 north of the city of White Sulphur Springs.  Its elevation is 2,037 feet (621 m).

The community's name is an anagram of Olean, New York, the native home of a local lumber dealer.

Climate
The climate in this area is characterized by hot, humid summers and generally mild to cool winters.  According to the Köppen Climate Classification system, Neola has a humid subtropical climate, abbreviated "Cfa" on climate maps.

See also
 List of geographic names derived from anagrams and ananyms

References

Unincorporated communities in Greenbrier County, West Virginia
Unincorporated communities in West Virginia